There were a succession of Soviet secret police agencies over time. The first secret police after the October Revolution, created by Vladimir Lenin's decree on December 20, 1917, was called "Cheka" (ЧК). Officers were referred to as "chekists", a name that is still informally applied to people under the Federal Security Service of Russia, the KGB's successor in Russia after the dissolution of the Soviet Union.

For most agencies listed here secret policing operations were only part of their function; for instance, the KGB was both the secret police and the intelligence agency.

History of the Soviet state security organs

Detailed chronology

Cheka (abbreviation of Vecheka, itself an acronym for "All-Russian Extraordinary Committee to Combat Counter-Revolution and Sabotage" of the Russian SFSR)
Felix Dzerzhinsky (December 20, 1917 – July 7, 1918)
Yakov Peters (July 7, 1918 – August 22, 1918)
Felix Dzerzhinsky (August 22, 1918 – February 6, 1922)

February 6, 1922: Cheka transforms into GPU, a department of the NKVD of the Russian SFSR.

NKVD – "People's Commissariat for Internal Affairs"
GPU – State Political Directorate
Dzerzhinsky (February 6, 1922 – November 15, 1923)

November 15, 1923: GPU leaves the NKVD and becomes all-union OGPU under direct control of the Council of People's Commissars of the USSR.

OGPU – "Joint State Political Directorate" or "All-Union State Political Board"
Dzerzhinsky (November 15, 1923 – July 20, 1926)
Vyacheslav Menzhinsky (July 30, 1926 – May 10, 1934)

July 10, 1934: NKVD of the Russian SFSR ceases to exist and transforms into the all-union NKVD of the USSR; OGPU becomes GUGB ("Main Directorate for State Security") in the all-union NKVD.

NKVD – "People's Commissariat for Internal Affairs"
GUGB – "Main Directorate for State Security"
Genrikh Yagoda (July 10, 1934 – September 26, 1936)
Nikolai Yezhov (September 26, 1936 – November 25, 1938)
Lavrentiy Beria (November 1938 – February 3, 1941)

February 3, 1941: The GUGB of the NKVD was briefly separated out into the NKGB, then merged back in, and then on April 14, 1943, separated out again.

NKGB – "People's Commissariat for State Security"
Vsevolod Merkulov (February 3, 1941 – July 20, 1941) (NKGB folded back into NKVD)
NKVD – "People's Commissariat for Internal Affairs"
GUGB – "Main Directorate for State Security"
Lavrentiy Beria (July 20, 1941 – April 14, 1943)
NKGB – "People's Commissariat for State Security"
Vsevolod Merkulov (April 14, 1943 – March 18, 1946) (NKGB reseparated from NKVD)

March 18, 1946: All People's Commissariats were renamed to Ministries.

MGB – "Ministry of State Security"
Viktor Abakumov (March 18, 1946 – July 14, 1951)
Sergei Ogoltsov (July 14, 1951 – August 9, 1951) (acting)
Semyon Ignatyev (August 9, 1951 – March 5, 1953)

The East German secret police, the Stasi, took their name from this iteration.

 – "Committee of Information" (foreign intelligence service)
Peter Fedotov MGB
Fedor Kuznetsov GRU
Yakov Malik Foreign Ministry

May 30, 1947: Official decision with the expressed purpose of "upgrading coordination of different intelligence services and concentrating their efforts on major directions". In the summer of 1948 the military personnel in KI were returned to the Soviet military to reconstitute foreign military intelligence service (GRU). KI sections dealing with the new East Bloc and Soviet émigrés were returned to the MGB in late 1948. In 1951 the KI returned to the MGB.

March 5, 1953: MVD and MGB are merged into the MVD by Lavrentiy Beria.

MVD – "Ministry of Internal Affairs"
Lavrentiy Beria (March 5, 1953 – June 26, 1953)
Sergei Kruglov (June 1953 – March 13, 1954)

March 13, 1954: Newly independent force became the KGB, as Beria was purged and the MVD divested itself again of the functions of secret policing. After renamings and tumults, the KGB remained stable until 1991.

KGB – Committee for State Security
Ivan Serov (March 13, 1954 – December 8, 1958)
Alexander Shelepin (December 25, 1958 – November 13, 1961)
Vladimir Semichastny (November 13, 1961 – May 18, 1967)
Yuri Andropov (May 18, 1967 – May 26, 1982)
Vitaly Fedorchuk (May 26, 1982 – December 17, 1982)
Viktor Chebrikov (December 17, 1982 – October 1, 1988)
Vladimir Kryuchkov (October 1, 1988 – August 28, 1991)
Leonid Shebarshin (August 22, 1991 – August 23, 1991) (acting)
Vadim Bakatin (August 29, 1991 –  December 3, 1991)

In 1991, after the State Emergency Committee failed to overthrow Gorbachev and Yeltsin took over, General Vadim Bakatin was given instructions to dissolve the KGB.

In Russia today, KGB functions are performed by the Foreign Intelligence Service (SVR), the Federal Counterintelligence Service which later became the Federal Security Service of the Russian Federation (FSB) in 1995, and the Federal Protective Service (FSO). The GRU continues to operate as well.

Leadership

See also
 
 
 
Commanders of the border troops USSR and RF
Director of the Federal Security Service
Director of the Foreign Intelligence Service
FAPSI – State communications, formed from the former 8th and 16th Directorates of KGB and later merged into FSB
List of chairmen of the KGB
Poison laboratory of the Soviet secret services

Notes

External links
 The Cold War International History Project (CWIHP) has the full text of former KGB agent Alexander Vassiliev's Notebooks with evidence of Soviet espionage in the United States during the Cold War
 Communist Secret Police: Cheka

 01
Secret police
Soviet intelligence agencies
Soviet secret police agencies
Defunct intelligence agencies
Politics of the Soviet Union
Human rights in the Soviet Union
.
.
Political repression in the Soviet Union